Goodenia heteromera, commonly known as spreading goodenia or fan flower, is a species of flowering plant in the family Goodeniaceae and is endemic to south-eastern Australia. It is a perennial or annual, stolon-forming herb with lance-shaped to egg-shaped leaves with the narrow end towards the base, and racemes of yellow flowers with brownish markings.

Description
The species is distinctive in having spreading upper corolla labes.

Taxonomy and naming
Goodenia heteromera was first formally described in 1859 by Ferdinand von Mueller in Fragmenta Phytographiae Australiae.
The specific epithet (heteromera) means "unequal-parts".

Distribution and habitat
This goodenia grows in heavy soil in Eucalyptus camaldulensis and E. largiflorens woodland in the Murray–Darling basin in Queensland, New South Wales, Victoria and South Australia.

Conservation status
Goodenia heteromera is classified as of "least concern" under the Queensland Government Nature Conservation Act 1992.

References

heteromera
Plants described in 1859
Taxa named by Ferdinand von Mueller
Flora of South Australia
Flora of Queensland
Flora of New South Wales
Flora of Victoria (Australia)